The Saturn Award for Best Streaming Superhero Series (formerly Saturn Award for Best New Media Superhero Series) is one of the annual awards given by the American Academy of Science Fiction, Fantasy & Horror Films. The Saturn Awards, which are the oldest film and series-specialized awards to reward science fiction, fantasy, and horror achievements, included the category for the first time at the 44th Saturn Awards. It specifically rewards superhero fiction streaming television series created for non-traditional platforms such as Netflix, Amazon, and Hulu.

At the 45th Saturn Awards, the category was retitled.

Winners and nominees 
The winners are listed in bold.

(NOTE: Year refers to year of eligibility, the actual ceremonies are held the following year)

2010s

See also
 Saturn Award for Best Superhero Television Series
 Saturn Award for Best New Media Television Series

References

External links
 Official site

Saturn Awards
Awards established in 2018